Holopyga fastuosa is a species of cuckoo wasp (insects belonging to the family Chrysididae).

Subspecies
 Holopyga fastuosa effrenata Linsenmaier, 1959
 Holopyga fastuosa fastuosa (H. Lucas, 1849)
 Holopyga fastuosa generosa (Förster, 1853)
 Holopyga fastuosa proviridis Linsenmaier, 1959
 Holopyga fastuosa virideaurata Linsenmaier, 1951

Distribution
This species is present in Greece, Italy, Spain, Slovenia, Switzerland, in the east Palearctic realm, in the Near East and in North Africa.

References 

Chrysidinae
Insects described in 1849
Hymenoptera of Europe